also known by his Chinese style name , was a lord (Aji), later prince (Wōji) of Ryukyu Kingdom.

Prince Tomigusuku was the second head of a royal family called Tomigusuku Udun. His father was Tomigusuku Chōryō (also known by Shō Kei ), the second son of King Shō Tei.

King Shō Eki dispatched a gratitude envoy for his accession to Edo, Japan in 1710. They sailed back in the next year.

He served as sessei from 1712 to 1722.

References

Princes of Ryūkyū
Sessei
People of the Ryukyu Kingdom
Ryukyuan people
18th-century Ryukyuan people